Christopher A. Schuh (born August 4, 1975) is an American metallurgist. He is the Danae and Vasilis Salapatas Professor in Metallurgy in the Department of Materials Science and Engineering at the Massachusetts Institute of Technology.

Schuh was elected as a member into the National Academy of Engineering in 2019 for contributions to design science and application of nanocrystalline metals.

Early life and education
Schuh was born on August 4, 1975. He earned his Bachelor of Science from the University of Illinois at Urbana–Champaign before attending Northwestern University's Robert R. McCormick School of Engineering and Applied Science for his PhD.  Schuh conducted his postdoctoral fellowship at Lawrence Livermore National Laboratory from 2001 to 2002.

Career
Schuh joined the faculty of Materials Science and Engineering at the Massachusetts Institute of Technology in 2002 as an assistant professor. Within two years, he was the recipient of the Presidential Early Career Award for Scientists and Engineers for his experimental and theoretical research. Schuh was shortly thereafter promoted to associate professor without tenure, during which he co-discovered a safer method for shrinking crystals for metal alloys. By 2009, Schuh's research team developed a nickel-tungsten alloy that is considered safer and more durable than chrome. He was also granted tenure, and received the 2009 Young Alumnus Award from the University of Illinois at Urbana–Champaign.

In 2011, Schuh was elected a MacVicar fellow for undergraduate teaching excellence and received the  SAE International Ralph R. Teetor Education Award. He was later appointed head of the Department of Materials Science and Engineering, succeeding Carl Thompson. The following year, Schuh, Tongjai Chookajorn, and Heather Murdoch co-developed a method to produce nanocrystals, alloys made of tiny grains which hold exceptional strength and other properties. By 2013, Schuh's research team developed a method of making minuscule ceramic objects flexible and able to hold “memory” for shape.

He also led a team of researchers through a high-speed imaging impact process, which could help engineers design materials for erosion protection in the future. They used the data collected from the study to predict the response of particles of a given size traveling at a given speed. In 2019, Schuh was elected a Member of the National Academy of Engineering, and fellow of the National Academy of Inventors.

References

1975 births
Living people
MIT School of Engineering faculty
Members of the United States National Academy of Engineering
American metallurgists
University of Illinois Urbana-Champaign alumni
Robert R. McCormick School of Engineering and Applied Science alumni
Fellows of the National Academy of Inventors
Fellows of the Minerals, Metals & Materials Society